The 1982–83 season was the 84th completed season of the English Football League.

Bob Paisley’s last season as Liverpool manager ended on a high as they topped the First Division with a comfortable lead. Paisley retired as Liverpool manager with a record 21 prizes in nine years. His successor was the club's long-serving coach Joe Fagan. Newly promoted Watford were the shock of the season, finishing in second place in their first season in the top flight.

Manchester City were relegated despite a four-year spending spree totalling around £5million. Swansea City were also relegated after only their second season as a First Division club. They had finished sixth a year earlier and at several stages had topped the league table. Brighton & Hove Albion joined them on the way down.

Queens Park Rangers, Wolverhampton Wanderers and Leicester City won promotion to the First Division. Rotherham United, Burnley and Bolton Wanderers were relegated to the Third Division. It was another blow for Bolton, who had been relegated from the First Division three years earlier.

Charlton Athletic and Wolverhampton Wanderers both came within hours of going bankrupt but were both saved by respective new owners.

Portsmouth’s revival continued as they ran away with the Third Division championship, followed closely behind by runners-up Cardiff City and third-placed Huddersfield Town. Newport County finished 4th, their highest post-World War II position in the Football League. Occupying the four relegation places were Reading, Wrexham, Doncaster Rovers and Chesterfield.

Wimbledon were crowned Fourth Division champions. Hull City, Port Vale and Scunthorpe United occupied the other three promotion places. The re-election system went in favour of the bottom four sides in the Fourth Division, all of whom were re-elected for the following season, but had things gone differently then Blackpool could have gone out of the Football League little over a decade after they had been a First Division side.

At the end of the season, Fourth Division strugglers Crewe Alexandra appointed Milan-born ex-Wimbledon manager Dario Gradi as their new manager.

Final league tables and results

The tables and results below are reproduced here in the exact form that they can be found at The Rec.Sport.Soccer Statistics Foundation website, with home and away statistics separated.

During the first five seasons of the league, that is, until the season 1893–94, re-election process concerned the clubs which finished in the bottom four of the league. From the 1894–95 season and until the 1920–21 season the re-election process was required of the clubs which finished in the bottom three of the league. From the 1922–23 season on it was required of the bottom two teams of both Third Division North and Third Division South. Since the Fourth Division was established in the 1958–59 season, the re-election process has concerned the bottom four clubs in that division.

First Division
Liverpool were dominant throughout Bob Paisley's final season as manager, retaining the league title and winning a third successive League Cup. Paisley, who had won 21 major trophies in nine seasons as manager, handed over the reins to his assistant Joe Fagan. 

Second place in the league went to Watford, who took the First Division by storm in their first season at this level. Manchester United won the FA Cup in Ron Atkinson's second season as manager, and also finished third in the league for the second consecutive season. Tottenham Hotspur continued to thrive, finishing fourth and qualifying for the UEFA Cup, although they failed to add any silverware to the FA Cup victories of 1981 and 1982. Nottingham Forest finished fifth and secured a place in the UEFA Cup. 

Brighton, who took Manchester United to a replay in the FA Cup final, went down in bottom place after four seasons in the First Division. Swansea City, who had finished sixth on their First Division debut a year earlier, were unable to maintain their fine form for a second season, and went down in second place from bottom. The final relegation place went to Manchester City, whose 17-year stay in the First Division was ended in the final minutes of the final game of the season, when a Raddy Antic goal gave visitors Luton Town a 1-0 victory and saved them from an immediate return to the Second Division.

For the first time in eight years, there were no English clubs winning European trophies this season.

Final table

Results

Managerial changes

Maps

Second Division

Results

Maps

Third Division

Results

Maps

Fourth Division

Results

Maps

Election/Re-election to the Football League
This year Enfield, the winners of the Alliance Premier League, could not apply for election because they did not meet Football League requirements, so 2nd placed Maidstone United won the right to apply for election to the Football League to replace one of the four bottom sides in the 1982–83 Football League Fourth Division. The vote went as follows:

As a result of this, all four Football League teams were re-elected, and Maidstone United were denied membership of the League.

See also
1982–83 in English football

References

 
English Football League seasons